The Last Resort is an American sitcom centered on a group of college students working in a hotel kitchen; the humor was in the style of Animal House, and it ran for one season of 15 episodes on CBS.

Cast
 Larry Breeding as Michael Lerner
 Robert Costanzo as Murray
 Stephanie Faracy as Gail Collins
 John Fujioka as Kevin
 Dorothy Konrad as Mrs. Trilling
 Zane Lasky as Duane Kaminsky
 Walter Olkewicz as Zach Comstock
 Ray Underwood as Jeffrey Barron

Episodes

Pilot

Season 1 (1979–80)

References
 
 

1970s American college television series
1980s American college television series
1970s American sitcoms
1980s American sitcoms
1970s American workplace comedy television series
1980s American workplace comedy television series
1979 American television series debuts
1980 American television series endings
CBS original programming
Television series by MTM Enterprises
Television series created by Gary David Goldberg
Television shows set in New York City